The Walsh County Courthouse in Grafton, North Dakota was built in 1940. It was listed on the National Register of Historic Places in 1985.

It was designed by architect T.B. Wells in Art Deco architecture.

References

Courthouses on the National Register of Historic Places in North Dakota
County courthouses in North Dakota
Art Deco architecture in North Dakota
Government buildings completed in 1940
National Register of Historic Places in Walsh County, North Dakota
1940 establishments in North Dakota
Grafton, North Dakota